Shengwang Du is a professor in the department of physics at The University of Texas at Dallas.

He is noted for having led a team that performed an experiment showing individual photons cannot travel faster than the speed of light (c) in a vacuum, thus apparently removing one approach to time travel.

Du claims in a peer reviewed journal to have observed single photons' precursors, saying that they travel no faster than c in a vacuum. His experiment involved slow light as well as passing light through a vacuum. He generated two single photons, passing one through rubidium atoms that had been cooled with a laser (thus slowing the light) and passing one through a vacuum. Both times, apparently, the precursors preceded the photons' main bodies, and the precursor traveled at c in a vacuum. According to Du, this implies that there is no possibility of light traveling faster than c (and, thus, violating causality). Some members of the media took this as an indication of proof that time travel to the past using superluminal speeds was impossible.

References

Living people
Year of birth missing (living people)
Hong Kong physicists
Academic staff of the Hong Kong University of Science and Technology
Fellows of the American Physical Society